Matthew Collings (born 1955) is a British art critic, writer, broadcaster, and artist. He is married to Emma Biggs, with whom he collaborates on art works.

Education
Born in London in 1955, Collings studied at Byam Shaw School of Art, and Goldsmiths College, both in London.

Life and career
He began his career working at Artscribe first in the production department in 1979 and later taking over as editor, filling that role from 1983 to 1987, bringing international relevance to the magazine.  In 1987 he received a Turner Prize commendation for his work on Artscribe.  Collings later moved into television working as a producer and presenter on the BBC The Late Show from 1989 to 1995.  In the early 1990s he brought Martin Kippenberger into the BBC studios to create an installation, and he interviewed Georg Herold while this Cologne-based conceptual artist painted a large canvas with beluga caviar.   He gave Jeff Koons his first sympathetic exposure on British TV, and Damien Hirst was also introduced for the first time to the UK TV audience by Collings.

He wrote and presented documentary films for the BBC on individual artists, such as Donald Judd, Georgia O'Keeffe and Willem de Kooning, as well as broader historical subjects such as Hitler's "Degenerate art" exhibition, art looted in the Second World War by Germany and Russia, Situationism, Spain's post-Franco art world and the rise of the Cologne art scene.

After leaving the BBC, Collings wrote 'Blimey! From Bohemia to Britpop: The London Artworld from Francis Bacon to Damien Hirst,' which humorously chronicled the rise of the Young British Art (YBA) movement.  Published in 1997 by 21, a new company founded by David Bowie, among a group of others, 'Blimey!'was described by Artforum magazine as “…one of the best-selling contemporary-art books ever."  (Kate Bush on the YBA Sensation, Artforum, 2004) The article went on to say that Collings "invented the perfect voice to complement YBA: He makes an impact without (crucially) ever appearing to try too hard." The following year, Collings wrote and presented the Channel 4 TV series This is Modern Art, which won him a Bafta (2000) among other awards.

Collings wrote and presented a Channel 4 series in 2003 about the "painterly" stream of Old Master painting, called Matt's Old Masters. A book by the same title accompanied the series. Further Channel 4 series by Collings included Impressionism: Revenge of the Nice (2004) and The Me Generations: Self Portraits, (2005). Between 1997 and 2005, Collings presented the Channel 4 TV programme on the Turner Prize.

In 2007 he wrote and presented the Channel 4 TV series This is Civilisation. In 2009 he appeared on the BBC2 programme "School of Saatchi" a reality TV show for newly trained UK artists.

In October 2010, he wrote and presented a BBC2 series called Renaissance Revolution, in which he discussed three Renaissance paintings: Raphael's Madonna del Prato; Hieronymus Bosch's The Garden of Earthly Delights; and Piero della Francesca's The Baptism of Christ. In 2014 he wrote and presented a 90-minute documentary for BBC4 on abstract art: The Rules of Abstraction considered early modernist beginnings by Paul Klee, Wassily Kandinsky, Hilma af Klint, and others, as well as contemporary continuities, ranging from Fiona Rae to El Anatsui. In the same year, Collings appeared in Frederick Wiseman's documentary, National Gallery composing and rehearsing a piece-to-camera on Turner's The Fighting Temeraire, for the documentary Turner's Thames, (2012), which Collings wrote and presented for BBC4.

Since 2015, he has been the regular art critic for the Evening Standard, replacing Brian Sewell, who died that year.

Suspension from Labour Party 

In 2019 Collings was picked as Parliamentary candidate for the Labour Party for the South West Norfolk constituency, but was suspended by the party a day later. Collings called Lord Sacks, the former Chief Rabbi of the UK, a “notorious hate-filled racist" after Sacks repeatedly condemned multiculturalism, celebrated a violent march of illegal settlers against Palestinians in Jerusalem, and named a racist book by Douglas Murray which claimed Enoch Powell "did not go far enough" his "book of the year."

With Emma Biggs
In October 2007, with his wife, Emma Biggs, Collings has curated many art exhibitions.  These include an exhibition of Picasso's late works at the HN Gallery in London. The paintings were from the 1960s series of  Painter and Model and Déjeuner sur l’herbe reworkings. According to the catalogue essay, written by Collings, the exhibition aimed to draw attention to Picasso's achievement as a manipulator of form rather than the popular myth of Picasso as a showman or lover or sensationalist genius.

Together Biggs and Collings create paintings based on intricate patterns. They have exhibited their work in London and abroad.

Books
 Blimey! - From Bohemia to Britpop: London Art World from Francis Bacon to Damien Hirst, 21 Publishing, 1997
 It Hurts - New York Art from Warhol to Now, 21 Publishing, 2000
 This is Modern Art, Weidenfeld & Nicolson and Watson-Guptill Publications, 2000
 Art Crazy Nation, 21 Publishing, 2001
 Sarah Lucas, Tate Publishing, 2002
 Matt's Old Masters: Titian, Rubens, Velázquez, Hogarth, Weidenfeld & Nicolson, 2003
 Criticism (with Matthew Arnatt), Rachmaninoff's, 2004
 Ron Arad interviewed by Matthew Collings, Phaidon, 2004
 This is Civilisation, 21 Publishing, 2008

Video and television
 Omnibus: Willem de Kooning (BBC TV documentary) Narrator 1995
 This Is Modern Art (Channel 4 TV series documentary) 1998
 Hello Culture - (Channel 4 TV series documentary) 2001
 2003 Matt's Old Masters (Channel 4 TV series documentary) Hogarth, Velázquez, Rubens, Titian
 Impressionism: Revenge of the Nice (Channel 4 TV series documentary) 2004
 Self Portraits (Channel 4 TV series documentary) 2005
 This Is Civilisation (BBC TV series documentary) 2007
 What is Beauty? (BBC TV documentary) 2009
 Renaissance Revolution: Raphael, Piero, Bosch (BBC TV series documentary) 2010
 Beautiful Equations (BBC4 TV one-hour documentary) 2010
 Turner's Thames (BBC2 1-hour documentary)
 The Rules of Abstraction with Matthew Collings (BBC4 TV documentary) 2014

References

External links
 Contains images and updated information on Collings and Biggs' work
 
 

1955 births
Living people
Alumni of Goldsmiths, University of London
Alumni of the Byam Shaw School of Art
British art critics
British male journalists
English contemporary artists